Nový Salaš is a village and municipality in Košice-okolie District in the Kosice Region of eastern Slovakia.

History
In historical records the village was first mentioned in 1533.

Geography
The village lies at an altitude of 350 metres and covers an area of 11.016 km².
It has a population of about 200 people.

External links

Villages and municipalities in Košice-okolie District